The Great Lakes Fishery Commission is a bi-national commission made up of representatives of the United States and Canada.  It was formed by the Convention on Great Lakes Fisheries, concluded in 1954 and ratified in 1955.  It has eight members: four members are appointed by the President of the United States, serving six-year terms, and four are appointed by the Privy Council of Canada.  The commission is charged, under Article Four of the Convention on Great Lakes Fisheries, with conducting research and making recommendations on the management of Great Lakes fisheries, as well attempting the eradication of the sea lamprey from the Great Lakes.

Background
The Sea Lamprey background had entered the Ontario Lake in the mid-1800s and in the Upper Great Lakes entered in 1921. The Sea Lamprey causes much destruction to ecosystems and other species of life, economic damage; but Sea Lamprey had a large change in life in the lakes of both Canada and United States of America. 
The sea lamprey is a parasitic invasive species fish that kills a large amount of the Great Lakes fish species like trout, salmon, sturgeon, and walleye.

Global issues
The Great Lakes Fishery Commission relates to global issues since the convention of the fisheries is bi-national commission. Both nations are doing research and recommending the management of the great lakes and the research directing on sea lamprey, there are 4 representatives from the President of United States and the other 4 are from Privy Council of Canada.
An executive secretary of the Canadian Privy Council named Robert Lambe. He spoke on the subject that the bi-national organizations team up together to solve a great problem in the Great Lakes region. Robert Lambe stated, "Sea lamprey will kill up to 40 pounds of Great Lakes fish, which is why control of the destructive invader is essential the seven billion fishery."
Another voice was brought up, and that was the president and CEO of the Grand Rapids White Water. He commented on how the funding will help support fish and went into further depth, pronouncing "These additional funds will help to leverage other local, state, and private dollars to support the restoration of the Grand River for everyone and ensure protection against invasive species." Privy Council of Canada and Great Lakes fishery commission are planning and working together to better the population of fish but more importantly aiming to control the invasive sea lamprey species.

Canada's government has been increasing their investment to control the sea lamprey and protect its fishery species. As to their funding as well it will greater the capacity of Canada's sea lamprey control program. Terry Sheehan, a member of the parliament for Sault Ste. Marie expressed about the program, saying "The sea lamprey control program of the Great Lakes Fishery Commission is a shining example of the binational commitment between Canada and the United States to protect the whole of the Great Lakes ecosystem. For generations our countries have worked cooperatively to reduce, and control, sea lamprey numbers. I am pleased to be reaffirming our dedication to the health and longevity of our beloved fisheries through this increase in annual funding to the Great Lakes Fishery." Sheehan had made it clear that working binational with the United States and Canada is great and would like to see this in the future to protect the ecosystems of the fisheries from invasive species.

Controlling the sea lamprey
The Sea Lamprey has become such a big problem since the Lamprey is an invasive species; they must be controlled to keep the ecosystems in check and be given the best ability for survival. 
Sea Lamprey will be controlled by a specific lampricide known as TFM. TFM kills sea lamprey largely; as the TFM has little to no impact to fish. The lampricide does not affect aquatic plants, invertebrates, wildlife, humans, or mammals and the TFM is non-toxic and the lampricide does not spread throughout the water.
The United States Fish and Wildlife, Fisheries and Oceans Canada, and United States Army Corps of Engineers team up to find a solution to keep the Lamprey in check and how to further figure out on how to control the Sea Lamprey. Sea Lamprey spends a good chunk of their lives filter feeding on larvae. So, the control to Sea Lamprey starts off to when the Biologists figure out and determine which lamprey contains the larval sea lamprey. The testing and figuring out the description of the larval and sea lamprey determines distribution, size structure, presence, and abundance in territories where they are located.

Great Lakes Fishery commission and the city of Grand Rapids white water will be receiving additional federal dollars to stop the invasive sea lamprey. The amount of federal dollars being received is a seven million dollar increase, more than the previous year. The money received from federal funding will be used to restore the rapids and making sure the sea lamprey is the primary priority needing to thin out; but also protecting and restoring the other species of fish by the lamprey. In this budget the commission will add a sea lamprey constructional barrier that will give the commission an easier way to manage the lamprey, but to also split the efficiency.

Trapping
To trap the sea lamprey the traps are set to catch the lamprey as they move upstream to spawn; which creates fewer individuals on the spawning population. By trapping the lamprey it provides a hit or miss where lamprey spawn, and really helps prevent reproducing lamprey.

References

External links 
 Official commission website

Intergovernmental organizations established by treaty
Fisheries agencies
Canada–United States relations
Great Lakes
Organizations based in Ann Arbor, Michigan
Organizations established in 1955
1955 establishments in Michigan